Crises of the Republic is an anthology of four essays by Hannah Arendt, dealing with contemporary American politics and the crises it faced in the 1960s and 1970s, published in 1972.

Structure 

Crises of the Republic was the third of Arendt's anthologies, and as the subtitle Lying in Politics, Civil Disobedience, On Violence, Thoughts on Politics and Revolution indicates, consists of four interconnected essays on contemporary American politics and the crises it faced in the 1960s and 1970s. The first essay, "Lying in Politics" looks for an explanation behind the administration's deception regarding the Vietnam War, as revealed in the Pentagon Papers. "Civil Disobedience" examines the opposition movements, while the final "Thoughts on Politics and Revolution" is a commentary, in the form of an interview on the third essay, "On Violence".

On Violence

In "On Violence", the third of these essays, Arendt breaks with the predominant conception of power as derived from violence, and that violence is an extreme manifestation of power. Power and violence are separate phenomena:

The explanation is that governmental violence requires organisation, i.e. power:

More generally, Arendt defines power as property of a group:

Though violence is not a precondition for power, it may nevertheless be a means of power.

Bureaucracies then attract violence since they are defined as the "rule by no one" against whom to argue. Thus, Bureaucracies exclude the relations with the people they rule over.

The Arendt-Agamben Correspondence
On February 21, 1970, twenty-seven-year-old Giorgio Agamben ground-mailed a typewritten request for Hannah Arendt to review his "On the Limits of Violence," mentioning that he had "take[n] the liberty of enclosing an essay on violence..." In a response drafted less than a week later, Arendt admitted that "it will take me quite a while to read it because my Italian is not just lousy, but almost nonexistent." Arendt had previously claimed that literati Zera S. Fink's 1945 book on a "Venetian vogue" for "stability" by mixed government, and the 1942 article in which Fink first examined il Discorsi passages translated and quoted in the works of James Harrington, partially germinated her research for On Revolution and additional studies. She was quite explicitly "indebted to Zera Fink's important study The Classical Republicans...for the influence of Machiavelli upon Harrington and the influence of the ancients upon seventeenth-century English thought, see the excellent study by Zera S. Fink." In any case, to Hannah Arendt, Agamben self-identified as a "young writer and essayist for whom discovering your books last year has represented a decisive new experience," in the context of Arendt's essay collection Between Past and Future. Before the Italian philosopher informed Henry Kissinger that "you understand absolutely nothing in politics" at the Weatherhead Center for International Affairs (at least, that's what he reminisced about in 2013 for the twenty-eighth issue of Bidoun), Agamben had "the pleasure of attending the seminars of Heidegger convened at Provence in the Summers of 1966 and 1968." Heideggerian Jean Beaufret and French poet René Char, the latter a renowned proponent of the French Resistance, attended those particular Le Thor seminars, presumably conducted in French and ancient Greek, on Hegelian dialectic as well as arche and ontological unity of opposites in fragments of Heraclitus. Arendt's editors—or Arendt herself—only included Agamben's "On the Limits of Violence" in a footnote for the 1969-70 German edition of Arendt's expanded version of her February 1969 "Reflections on Violence," first published in full in the New York Review of Books, and as a long essay in the 1973 Crises of the Republic. Agamben published his essay for an Italian-language literary periodical later in 1970 and for the English-language Diacritics in 2009. Agamben had critically assessed, and reformulated, Arendt's arguments in "We Refugees" in 1995.

References

Bibliography 
 
 Lying in Politics full text

Bibliographic notes 

1972 non-fiction books
Books by Hannah Arendt
Books in political philosophy
Contemporary philosophical literature
Essay collections
Political books
Political philosophy